Love Adventure is the second single album by the South Korean girl group Cherry Bullet. It was released digitally and physically on May 22, 2019, by FNC Entertainment. It contains three tracks, including the lead single "Really Really". This was the final release with members Mirae, Kokoro and Linlin, before they left the group on December 13, 2019.

Background and release
On May 9, it was revealed that Cherry Bullet would release their second single, Love Adventure with title track "Really Really", on May 22.

Concept images of each of the members were released from May 13 to May 17.
 
A music video teaser was released on May 18 and the full music video on May 22 together with the single release.

Promotion
Cherry Bullet held a live showcase at the YES24 Live Hall in Gwangjin-gu, Seoul, on May 22, where they performed "Really Really" along with "Ping Pong". Cherry Bullet collaborated with LG U+ to establish an augmented reality / virtual reality experience zone and actively introduced it. LG U+  set up an AR / VR experience zone on the scene.

The group started promoting the title track "Really Really" on May 23. They first performed the lead single on Mnet's M Countdown, followed by performances on KBS' Music Bank, MBC's Show! Music Core and SBS' Inkigayo.

Track listing

Charts

Release history

References

2019 singles
Korean-language songs
2019 songs
FNC Entertainment singles
Single albums